Korpilahti is a former municipality of Finland. Together with Jyväskylän maalaiskunta, Korpilahti was consolidated with Jyväskylä on January 1, 2009.

It is located in the former province of Western Finland and is part of the Central Finland region. There are about 4,500 summer-time inhabitants visiting the 2,000 summer cottages.

The municipality is unilingually Finnish. The municipality was also known as "Korpilax" in Swedish. The Swedish name is now considered outdated according to the Institute for the Languages of Finland. Politically, Centre Party is dominant. Korpilahti was one of the poorest municipalities in Finland with an unemployment rate of 14.4% (2002).

Korpilahti is relatively well known for its beautiful nature, with mountains and about 200 lakes. Lake Päijänne, the second greatest lake in Finland, is partially in the area of Korpilahti.

Geography

Neighboring municipalities 
The municipality of Korpilahti bordered Jyväskylän mlk, Muurame, Toivakka, Joutsa, Luhanka, Jämsä, Jämsänkoski and Petäjävesi. It bordered Koskenpää instead of Jämsänkoski until 1969 and Leivonmäki instead of Joutsa until 2008.

Villages
Prior to its consolidation into Jyväskylä in 2009, Korpilahti consisted of the following villages:

 Moksi, Tikkala, Oittila, Saukkola, Ylä-Muuratjärvi, Putkilahti, Saakoski and Sarvenperä

History 
Korpilahti has existed at least since 1596 in Swedish sources as Kårpilaxiby, when it was a part of the parish of Jämsä. It became a separate parish in 1861.

The municipality of Muurame was split off from Korpilahti in 1921, while Säynätsalo was split off from Muurame in 1924. The municipality of Korpilahti became a part of Jyväskylä in 2009.

Vaaruvuori
A Pumped-storage hydroelectricity plant was planned on Vaaruvuori near lake Päijänne but environmentalist opposition has killed the project.

References

External links

 Municipality of Korpilahti – Official website

Populated places disestablished in 2009
2009 disestablishments in Finland
Former municipalities of Finland
Jyväskylä
Korpilahti